| tries = {{#expr:
+6 +6 +5 +3 +2 +0 +7 +5 +6 +6 +1 +6
+4 +4 +3 +5 +3 +7 +3 +2 +2 +6 +2 +5
+0 +2 +4 +2 +7 +10 +1 +0 +2 +3 +8 +0
+0 +2 +1 +3 +7 +5 +3 +1 +6 +2 +2 +9
+0 +3 +4 +7 +4 +11 +4 +6 +6 +4 +4 +6
+2 +1 +6 +1 +4 +2 +6 +4 +5 +6 +1 +3
+6 +3 +0 +0
+2 +0
+3
}}
| top point scorer = Morgan Parra (Clermont)(113 points)
| top try scorer = Napolioni Nalaga (Clermont)(8 tries)
| venue = Aviva Stadium, Dublin
| attendance2 = 50,148
| champions =  Toulon
| count = 1
| runner-up =  Clermont
| website = https://web.archive.org/web/20080506141030/http://www.ercrugby.com/eng/
| previous year = 2011–12
| previous tournament = 2011–12 Heineken Cup
| next year = 2013–14
| next tournament = 2013–14 Heineken Cup
}}The 2012–13 Heineken Cup was the 18th season of the Heineken Cup, the annual rugby union European club competition for clubs from the top six nations in European rugby. The tournament began with two pool matches on 12 October 2012 and ended with the final at the Aviva Stadium in Dublin on 18 May 2013.

Leinster, who became one of only two clubs ever to win two consecutive Heineken Cups in 2012, attempted to become the first club ever to win the competition three straight years. However they were eliminated at the pool stages, the first defending champions to do so since London Wasps in 2007–08. Toulon won an all-French final 16–15 against Clermont.

Teams
The default allocation of teams is as follows:
 England: 6 teams, based on performance in the Aviva Premiership and Anglo–Welsh Cup
 France: 6 teams, based on regular-season finish in the Top 14
 Ireland: 3 teams, based on regular-season finish in Pro12
 Wales: 3 teams, based on regular-season finish in Pro12
 Italy and Scotland: 2 teams each, based on participation in Pro12 (as there are only 2 from each nation)

The remaining two places are filled by the winners of the previous year's Heineken Cup and Amlin Challenge Cup. If the cup winners are already qualified through their domestic league, an additional team from their country will claim a Heineken Cup place (assuming another team is available). Accordingly, Biarritz claimed the Challenge Cup winner's berth, and since Heineken Cup winners Leinster were already qualified through Pro12, the extra Irish berth went to Connacht.

Teams are listed in the order they are presented to Heineken Cup organiser European Rugby Cup by their respective leagues. In the cases of England and France, this does not necessarily match the teams' placement in their national leagues in the preceding season.

Seeding
The seeding system was the same as in the 2011–12 tournament. The 24 competing teams are ranked based on past Heineken Cup and European Challenge Cup performance, with each pool receiving one team from each quartile, or Tier. The requirement to have only one team per country in each pool, however, still applies (with the exception of the inclusion of the seventh French team).

The brackets show each team's European Rugby Club Ranking at the end of the 2011–12 season.

Pool stage

The draw for the pool stage took place on 12 June 2012 at the Aviva Stadium.

Under the rules of the competition organiser, European Rugby Cup, tie–breakers within each pool are as follows.
 Competition points earned in head–to–head matches
 Total tries scored in head–to–head matches
 Point differential in head–to–head matches

ERC has four additional tie–breakers, used if tied teams are in different pools, or if the above steps cannot break a tie between teams in the same pool:
 Tries scored in all pool matches
 Point differential in all pool matches
 Best disciplinary record (fewest players receiving red or yellow cards in all pool matches)
 Coin toss

Pool 1

Pool 2

Pool 3

Pool 4

Pool 5

Pool 6

Seeding and runners–up
 Bare numbers indicate Heineken Cup quarter–final seeding.
 Numbers with "C" indicate Challenge Cup quarter–final seeding.

Knock–out stages
All kick–off times are local to the match location.

Quarter–finals

Semi–finals

Final

See also

 2012–13 European Challenge Cup

References

External links
Official Site 
2012–13 Heineken Cup at ESPN

 
Heineken Cup seasons
Heineken
Heineken
Heineken
Heineken
Heineken
Heineken